The Amalgamated Wheelwrights, Smiths and Kindred Trades Union was a trade union representing workers involved in vehicle building in the United Kingdom.

The union was founded in 1908, when the Cardiff-based Amalgamated Wheelwrights' and Carriage Makers' Union merged with the Bolton-based Wheelwrights and Smiths' Society, forming the Amalgamated Society of Wheelwrights, Smiths and Motor Body Makers.  By 1911, it was based in Manchester, and had a membership of 1,897.  It affiliated to the Trades Union Congress, and grew rapidly.  In 1921, it adopted its final name, at which time, it claimed a membership of 11,000.  Its merger into the National Union of Vehicle Builders was agreed in 1923, and completed in 1925.

References

Trade unions in the United Kingdom
Trade unions established in 1908
Trade unions disestablished in 1925
Vehicle industry trade unions